Roman Šuster (born 8 January 1978) is a Czech rugby union player. He plays as a prop.

He moved to France, where he has been playing for Sporting Nazairien Rugby (2004/05), USA Limoges (2005/06-2006/07), Villeurbanne (2007/08), Stade Rouennais Rugby (2008/09), FC Auch Gers (2009/10), Stade Aurillacois Cantal Auvergne, since 2010/11.

Šuster has currently 16 caps for the Czech Republic national team, since 2003, with 2 tries scored, 10 points in aggregate.

External links
Roman Šuster International Statistics

1978 births
Living people
Czech rugby union players
Rugby union props
Czech expatriate rugby union players
Expatriate rugby union players in France
Czech expatriate sportspeople in France